Physea is a genus of beetles in the family Carabidae, containing the following species:

 Physea breyeri Ogueta, 1963 
 Physea hirta Leconte, 1853 
 Physea latipes Schaum, 1864 
 Physea setosa Chaudoir, 1868 
 Physea testudinea (Klug, 1834)
 Physea tomentosa Chaudoir, 1854

References

Paussinae